Members of the New South Wales Legislative Council between 1973 and 1976 were indirectly elected by a joint sitting of the New South Wales Parliament, with 15 members elected every three years. The most recent election was on 5 April 1973, with the term of new members commencing on 23 April 1973. The President was Sir Harry Budd.

References

See also
Fifth Askin ministry
Sixth Askin ministry
First Lewis ministry
Second Lewis ministry
Willis ministry

Members of New South Wales parliaments by term
20th-century Australian politicians